Impy's Island, or Urmel from the Ice Age, is a 2006 German computer-animated feature film based on the children's novel Urmel from the Ice Age by Max Kruse.

Plot summary
On a magical tropical island called Tikiwoo in the 1950s, a fun-loving group of misfit animals and people make a marvelous discovery: a baby dinosaur frozen since prehistoric times. Little Impy, as they call him, is loving his new family and ready to explore the strange new world. But when a king from a faraway country vows to capture the lovable baby dino for his private collection, all the inhabitants of Impy's island must join together to save their new friend.

Cast
The film stars the voice talents of:
 Wigald Boning as Professor Habakuk Tibatong
 Anke Engelke as Wutz
 Florian Halm as Diener Sami
 Christoph Maria Herbst as Doctor Zwengelmann
 Kevin Iannotta as Tim Tintenklecks
 Stefan Krause as Pinguin Ping
 Oliver Pocher as Schuhschnabel Schusch
 Domenic Redl as Urmel
 Frank Schaff as Waran Wawa
 Klaus Sonnenschein as King Pumponell
 Wolfgang Völz as See-Elefant Seele-Fant

For the American release, the voice talents are the following:
 Lisa Ortiz as Impy 
 Zoe Martin as Ping the king penguin
 Maddie Blaustein as Shoe the shoebill
 Sean Schemmel as King Pumponell the 55th
 Charlotte Mahoney as Peg the house pig
 Pete Bowlan as Sami
 Michael Sinterniklaas as Professor Horatio Tibberton
 Jimmy Zoppi as Monty the monitor lizard
 Alan Smithee as Dr. Zonderburgh
 P.J. Battisti, Jr. as Tim
 Michael Alston Baley as Solomon the elephant seal

Release
 February 27, 2007 (DVD)

See also
List of animated feature films
List of computer-animated films

External links

References 

2006 films
2006 computer-animated films
2000s children's animated films
German animated films
2000s children's fantasy films
German children's films
German fantasy films
2000s German-language films
Films directed by Reinhard Klooss
Films scored by James Dooley
Films set on islands
Films based on German novels
HanWay Films films
Animated films based on children's books
Animated films about dinosaurs
Animated films about penguins
Films based on television series
Films set in the 1950s
Films set on fictional islands
Fictional islands
2000s German films

